Storm Runner is a launched roller coaster located at Hersheypark in Hershey, Pennsylvania. Manufactured by Intamin and situated in the Pioneer Frontier section of the park, the Accelerator Coaster opened to the public on May 8, 2004. Storm Runner features a top hat element, three inversions, a dual loading station, and a magnetic braking system. In addition, it was designed to interact with three other Hersheypark rides: Dry Gulch Railroad, the Monorail, and Trailblazer.

Storm Runner is the first accelerator coaster to utilize over-the-shoulder restraints and the first to have a dual-loading station with switch tracks. It was also the first accelerator coaster to feature inversions; Kanonen at Liseberg was the second.

History
In August 2003, Hersheypark announced that it had hired Swiss roller coaster manufacturer Intamin to construct a new launched coaster in the Pioneer Frontier section of the park. The ride would replace Balloon Flite, a children's ride that had operated for 23 years. Hershey Entertainment and Resorts Company was considering one of three names for the coaster: Steel Stampede, Renegade, and Storm Runner. Hershey Entertainment hosted a contest in which members of the public could vote on the name. More than 46,000 people voted on the name over a two-week period. In November 2003, before the name was officially announced, Hershey Entertainment filed a trademark for the name "Storm Runner". Hershey Entertainment formally announced the coaster's name on November 5, 2003. Construction of Storm Runner began in February 2004 and ultimately cost $12.5 million. By April 2004, test runs for the coaster had commenced.

Storm Runner first opened on May 8, 2004. The first people to ride the coaster included members of the Pennsylvania Army National Guard, as well as winners of an online lottery. Initially, the queue line would often be extended with ropes due to the ride's popularity. In 2005, the park added an overflow queue line located next to Trailblazer's first drop.

For the 2020 season, Storm Runner remained closed while waiting on necessary parts for maintenance and repairs that were delayed due to the global COVID-19 pandemic. Storm Runner reopened during the 2021 season.

Ride experience 
The duration of the ride is about 58 seconds (including the wait on the launch track). The track has near-miss points with three attractions: the Hersheypark monorail, Dry Gulch Railroad, and Trailblazer. As the train leaves the station, it moves through the switch track, and onto the launch track. As the train moves into position, the sound of a heartbeat is heard. After a brief pause, the train rolls backwards slightly, the brakes on the launch track retract, and a pre-recorded voice says "Now, get ready! Here we go!". A second or so later, the train is launched from 0-72 mph in 1.9 seconds. Part way down the launch track, the riders' photographs are taken.

Immediately following the launch, the train climbs vertically through a 150 ft top hat. The train then drops 180 ft, reaching the top speed of 75 mph, and then climbs into a 135 ft tall cobra loop, a first-of-its-kind element. After another drop, the train traverses yet another first-of-its-kind element, the Flying Snake Dive (a heartline roll followed by a dive drop). Following the final inversion, the train descends and crosses over Spring Creek and a section of Trailblazer, and under a section of the monorail. The train then rises through two banked turns, first to the right, then the left. After a brief moment of air time, the train enters the final brake run. Following the brake run, the train curves to the left, and returns to the side of the station from which it was dispatched.

Launch system
Storm Runner is an Accelerator Coaster, and its trains are launched hydraulically. Hershey Entertainment had chosen a hydraulic launch system because it used much less energy compared to a linear induction motor system. The hydraulic launch system is powered by hydraulic pumps, which pumps push hydraulic fluid into several accumulators. As the hydraulic fluid fills the accumulators, it pushes on the pistons, compressing the nitrogen. A similar system is used on Top Thrill Dragster and Xcelerator, although Storm Runner was the first hydraulic launch coaster to feature inversions.

Incidents
On June 26, 2018, a 9-year-old boy's safety harness allegedly could not be properly secured when he was on board one of the cars. His father (who was properly strapped in and was also riding with him) noticed that he began to feel terrified as if he felt like he was going to fall off and die from his injuries when the ride was in motion. The ride operators allegedly failed to address the concern when asked for assistance by the father. As the train exited the station, the boy got off of the ride at the last moment, leaving his father aboard as he exited the attraction. It was revealed that he and his father have suffered anxiety-like symptoms as a result of the incident. A lawsuit was filed two years later on July 2, 2020.

References

Hersheypark
Roller coasters introduced in 2004